Fayadh Minati (born 1966) is an Iraqi wrestler. He competed in the men's freestyle 52 kg at the 1988 Summer Olympics.

References

External links
 

1966 births
Living people
Iraqi male sport wrestlers
Olympic wrestlers of Iraq
Wrestlers at the 1988 Summer Olympics
Place of birth missing (living people)